Mafraq ( Al-Mafraq, local dialects: Mafrag or Mafra) is the capital city of Mafraq Governorate in Jordan, located 80 km to the north of the national capital, Amman. It is located at a crossroads, with a road north going to Syria and another road to the east going to Iraq. It had 56,340 inhabitants in 2004.

History

Mafraq was first settled in the 4th century BC. It is located about 17 km west of the historic Nabataean and Byzantine town of Umm el-Jimal, which was built in the 1st century.

The city was first named "Fudain", which comes from the word for fortress in Arabic. The city gained significance after the establishment of the Hejaz Railway connecting Istanbul to Medina in 1908. The Ottoman Turks renamed the city "Mafraq", which means "crossroads" in Arabic. Mafraq was the location of a British military base and airport from the early 20th century. It later became the base for the Arab Legion during the 1948 Arab–Israeli War. In 1945, the Municipality of Mafraq was established, with Ali Abdeyyah as its first mayor. During the Second World War, the city's military base hosted British troops from India, Australia and other British colonies.

Mafraq is the headquarters of the Third Division of the Jordanian Army. King Hussein Air College and an air base of the Royal Jordanian Air Force are also located in the city.

As of 2016, 50% of the population of Mafraq were Syrian refugees.

Geography
The city of Mafraq is located in northern Jordan at the boundary between the Hauran plateau and the Syrian Desert, about 80 km north of Amman. It is the capital and largest city of Mafraq Governorate. The city is close to three major cities in the region, Amman to the south, Irbid to the west, and Damascus to the north.

Climate
Mafraq has a cold semi-arid climate (Köppen climate classification BSk). Most rain falls in the winter. About  of precipitation falls annually.

Transport
The international highway that connects Damascus to Riyadh passes through the city. Mafraq has a station on the  national railway system.

Education
Al al-Bayt University is the only university in the city. It was established in 1992 and is located on the south-eastern outskirts of Mafraq city.

See also
 King Hussein Air Base 
 Railway stations in Jordan

References

External links
 Official website
 Photos of Al Mafraq at the American Center of Research

Populated places in Mafraq Governorate